Lanthanum trifluoride is a refractory ionic compound of lanthanum and fluorine.

The LaF3 structure

Bonding is ionic with lanthanum highly coordinated.  The cation sits at the center of a trigonal prism.  Nine fluorine atoms are close:  three at the bottom corners of the trigonal prism, three in the faces of the trigonal prism, and three at top corners of the trigonal prism.  There are also two fluorides a little further away above and below the prism.  The cation can be considered 9-coordinate or 11-coordinate. At 300 K, the structure allows the formation of Schottky defects with an activation energy of 0.07 eV, and free flow of fluoride ions with an activation energy of 0.45 eV, making the crystal unusually electrically conductive.

The larger sized rare earth elements (lanthanides), which are those with smaller atomic number, also form trifluorides with the LaF3 structure. Some actinides do as well.

Applications
This white salt is sometimes used as the "high-index" component in multilayer optical elements such as ultraviolet dichroic and narrowband mirrors. Fluorides are among the most commonly used compounds for UV optical coatings due to their relative inertness and transparency  in the far ultraviolet (FUV)  Multilayer reflectors and antireflection coatings are typically composed of pairs of transparent materials, one with a low index of refraction, the other with a high index. LaF is one of very few high-index materials in the far UV. The material is also a component of multimetal fluoride glasses such as ZBLAN. It is also doped with europium(II) fluoride in fluoride selective electrodes.

Natural occurrence
LaF3 occurs in the nature as the extremely rare mineral fluocerite-(La). The suffix in the name is known as the Levinson modifier and, by showing the dominant element at a particular site in the structure, is used to differentiate from similar minerals (here: fluocerite-(Ce)).

References

Lanthanum compounds
Fluorides
Lanthanide halides
Crystal structure types